HMS Diomede (F16) was a  of the Royal Navy. She was built by Yarrow Shipbuilders in Glasgow. Diomede was launched on 15 April 1969 and commissioned on 2 April 1971. In 1998, the vessel was taken out of service and sold to Pakistan. Renamed PNS Shamsheer, the vessel served with the Pakistan Navy until being scrapped.

Service history

Royal Navy service
In 1972, Diomede took part in the Second Cod War during the fishing dispute with Iceland, though Diomedes involvement was more quiet than her involvement in the subsequent Cod War. Also that year, Diomede joined the 3rd Frigate Squadron which was then based in the Far East.

In 1974, Diomede, took part in Task Group (TG) 317.2 which was a deployment that caused some controversy back in the UK when the TG, on its way to the Far East/Pacific, visited South Africa, which was at that time under apartheid rule, as well as performing military exercises with the South African armed forces. Diomede, along with the nuclear submarine , visited the port of Simonstown while the rest of the TG visited Cape Town. The TG, upon reaching the Far East performed a number of exercises and 'fly the flag' visits with Far East and Pacific countries. They did not visit South Africa on their return, and headed to Brazil for an exercise with the Brazilian Navy. Diomede returned to the UK in June 1975.

The following year, Diomede joined the Fishery Protection Squadron, and took part in the Third Cod War.

In 1977, Diomede took part in the Fleet Review, in honor of Queen Elizabeth II's Silver Jubilee as part of the 3rd Frigate Squadron. The ship was adopted by the borough of Langbaurgh in North Yorkshire in 1978.

Also in the 1970s, Diomede was one of the seven Leanders used as the fictional  for the BBC TV drama series Warship. All members of the crew were given Hero cap tallies for filming purposes.

Her modernisation that would have given her Exocet and Sea Wolf was cancelled due to John Nott's 1981 Defence Review and she was intended to be placed in the Standby Squadron but the decision was repealed due to the 1982 Falklands War. During that year, Diomede was deployed to the Persian Gulf as part of the Armilla patrol.

In 1983 she deployed again to the West Indies as the 'West Indies Guardship' accompanying Queen Elizabeth II aboard . The Queen was so impressed by the way her ship's company performed their duties, that she ordered 'splice the mainbrace'.

Diomede returned to the South Atlantic in 1987 where she performed a number of patrols in the vicinity of the Falkland Islands as well as visiting the Island of South Georgia.

Pakistan Navy service

In 1988, Diomede was decommissioned from the Royal Navy and subsequently sold to Pakistan where she was renamed PNS Shamsheer. Shamsheer continued in service for many years until she was decommissioned by Pakistan Navy and scrapped.

References

Publications

Marriott, Leo, 1983.  Royal Navy Frigates 1945-1983, Ian Allan Ltd.  

 

Leander-class frigates
Ships built on the River Clyde
1969 ships
Ships of the Fishery Protection Squadron of the United Kingdom
Frigates of the Pakistan Navy
Pakistan–United Kingdom relations